Ziyad Rahman Alevakkatt Abdul Rahiman (born May 12, 1972) is an Indian judge who is presently serving as a judge of Kerala High Court. The High Court of Kerala is the highest court in the Indian state of Kerala and in the Union Territory of Lakshadweep. The High Court of Kerala is headquartered at Ernakulam, Kochi

Early life and education
Rahman was born to Adv.A.A.Abdul Rahman and Latheepha at Thrikkakkara, Ernakulam District on May 12, 1972. He attended Mary Matha English Medium School, Thrikkakkara, Cardinal High School, Thrikkakkara, graduated in economics from St. Paul's College, Kalamassery and obtained Degree in law from YMS Law College, Kundapura, Karnataka in 1996.

Career
Rahman enrolled as an Advocate on August 31, 1997 and started practicing in High Court of Kerala and Subordinate Courts in Ernakulam mainly in Electricity Act, Motor Vehicles Act, Insurance Act, Employees Compensation Act, Land Laws etc. During his practice, he served as Standing Counsel for New India Assurance Company Ltd. from 2011 till his elevation. He was appointed as Additional Judge of High Court of Kerala on February 25, 2021 and became permeant judge from June 6, 2022.

References

External links
 High Court of Kerala

Living people
1972 births
Judges of the Kerala High Court
20th-century Indian judges